Most mass media in Burundi is controlled by the government.

Radio
As of 30 June 2021,  Burundi registers the following radio stations (Telecommunications Authority, 2021):

Nationally owned radio stations

 RADIO BUNTU IJWI RY’IMPFUVYI N’ABAPFAKAZI
 RADIO » IJWI RY’ IMBABAZI
 RADIO BENAA FM
 RADIO CCIB FM+
 RADIO AGAKIZA
 RADIO COLOMBE FM
 RADIO CULTURE
 RADIO DESTINY FM
 RADIO EAGLE SPORT FM
 RADIO FREQUENCE MENYA
 RADIO IJWI RY’ UMUKENYEZI
 RADIO ISANGANIRO
 RADIO IZERE FM
 RADIO MARIA BDI
 RADIO REMA FM
 RADIO SCOLAIRE NDERAGAKURA FM
 RADIO SPECIALE HUMURIZA FM
 RADIO STAR FM

Internationally owned radio stations

 RFI
 RADIO HIT AFRIQUE
 RADIO ROYAL MEDIA.

The addresses and frequency assigned to those stations are summarized in the table below (Communications Commission, 2021):

Television
Television in Burundi was introduced in 1984, with coverage having national reach in 1992. As of 2004 there was still only one television service, the government-owned Télévision Nationale du Burundi. 

The television stations registered in 2021 are the following (Telecommunications Authority):

 TELEVISION NATIONALE DU BURUNDI
 HERITAGE TV
 REMA TV
 TELEVISION SALAMA
 CITIZEN TV (satellite)
 TELEVISION NUMERIQUE DENOMMEE « BEST ENTERTAINMENT TELEVISION (BE TV) »
 TELEVISION « MASHARIKI TV »
 TELEVISION BURUNDI BWIZA

Main channels 

There are also three main tele distributors:

 TELE -10
 STARTIMES
 AZAM MÉDIA.

Internet

Burundi has  launched a $25 million investment project in a fibre-optic cable network to widen access to broadband Internet and cut costs.

Print
Newspapers include:
 Arc-en-Ciel
 Burundi Chrétien
 Burundi Tribune
 Le Renouveau du Burundi

Iwacu, founded abroad in 1993, began publishing in Burundi as a weekly in 2008. It quickly became the most-circulated newspaper in Burundi and as of 2016 is the only privately-owned one.

See also
 Burundian literature
 arte
 Internet censorship and surveillance in Burundi
 BeTV (Burundi)

Bibliography

References

External links
 
 

 
Communications in Burundi
Burundi